Channel One Eurasia (Russian: Первый Канал Евразия/ Perviy Kanal Evraziya) is a local Kazakh television station that has been in operation since October 1997. It is one of many privately owned television stations in Kazakhstan closely monitored for any bad press about the Kazakh government.

List of programmes broadcast on Perviy Kanal Evraziya

Information
There are frequent news broadcasts throughout the day including news, sport & weather.

Dobroe Utro, Kazakhstan!, (Russian News) every morning at 09:00.
 News Every Morning at 10:00. Every Night at 18:00.
Sport Every Σάββατο 21:00
 SPORT 3  Every Night 21:00 an Every Morning 15:00

Culture and Entertainment
Many Russian serials are aired often during the week.
 The Simpsons Entertainment Version ShowSuperStar KZ, the Kazakh version of Pop Idol.
Povtornaya Zagruzka, a drama series.
Muzhchiny Ne Plachut, a crime drama series.

Imported shows
Perviy Kanal Evraziya broadcasts many western documentaries, box office films & Russian talk shows.

Former children's showsNote: during the 2000s Channel One Eurasia have deals from TV Loonland and Sony Pictures Television (MiB only) for broadcasting their library content. Fat Dog Mendoza Letters from Felix Redwall Pettson and Findus Men in Black: The Animated Series''

References

External links

Television stations in Kazakhstan